The 4083d Strategic Wing (4083d SW) is a discontinued United States Air Force unit, that was stationed at Thule Air Base, Greenland, where it was discontinued on 1 July 1959.

The 4083d SW was a non-flying ground service support element for the Strategic Air Command (SAC) Eighth Air Force, based at Thule Air Base, Greenland. It was established on 1 April 1957 and inactivated on 1 July 1959.  When activated, the wing assumed the resources (Manpower, Equipment, Weapons, & Facilities) of the 6607th Air Base Wing, which had originally been established on 1 January 1956. Throughout its existence it was controlled by Strategic Air Command.  Eighth Air Force provided intermediate command and control from its establishment until its inactivation, being assigned to Thule AB during its entire existence.

The wing controlled operations at Thule when SAC took control of base from Northeast Air Command. The 4083d primarily providing support for aerial refueling KC-135s and transient alert for aircraft being sent to Thule on 90-day rotational deployments. Also operated base host facilities. It operated NORAD early warning RADAR network for United States and Canada. It was redesignated the 4083d Air Base Wing 1 July 1959, and then inactivated on 1 July 1960 when Air Defense Command's 683d Air Base Group took over host responsibility at Thule.

References

Strategic wings of the United States Air Force
Four Digit Wings of the United States Air Force
Military units and formations established in 1957
Military units and formations disestablished in 1966